A rock formation is an isolated, scenic, or spectacular surface rock outcrop. Rock formations are usually the result of weathering and erosion sculpting the existing rock. The term rock formation can also refer to specific sedimentary strata or other rock unit in stratigraphic and petrologic studies.

A rock structure can be created in any rock type or combination:
 Igneous rocks are created when molten rock cools and solidifies, with or without crystallisation. They may be either plutonic bodies or volcanic extrusive. Again, erosive forces sculpt their current forms.
 Metamorphic rocks are created by rocks that have been transformed into another kind of rock, usually by some combination of heat, pressure, and chemical alteration.
 Sedimentary rocks are created by a variety of processes but usually involving deposition, grain by grain, layer by layer, in water or, in the case of terrestrial sediments, on land through the action of wind or sometimes moving ice. Erosion later exposes them in their current form.

Geologists have created a number of terms to describe different rock structures in the landscape that can be formed by natural processes:

 Butte 
 Cliff
 Cut bank
 Escarpment
 Gorge
 Inselberg, or monadnock
 Mesa
 Peak
 Promontory
 River cliff
 Sea cliff
 Stack
 Stone run
 Tor

Here is a list of rock formations by continent.

Asia

Armenia

Geghard
Garni Gorge
Goris
Khndzoresk

China

Yunmeng Mountain National Forest Park, Beijing
Guilin, Guangxi Zhuang Autonomous Region 
Huangshan, Anhui Province
Wulingyuan Scenic and Historic Interest Area, Zhangjiajie, Hunan

Hong Kong
Amah Rock, New Territories
Lion Rock, New Kowloon/New Territories

Jordan

Petra, Amman
Wadi Rum Desert

India

Jabalpur Marble Rocks, Madhya Pradesh
Rock Formations in Rayalseema Andhra Pradesh, Hampi Karnataka
Yana

Israel

Rosh Hanikra
Timna Arch, Eilat
Karnei Hattin

Lebanon

Cape Lithoprosopon
Raouché, Beirut

Mongolia
Turtle Rock, Gorkhi-Terelj National Park, Töv Aimag/Nalaikh

Pakistan
Rock formations at Hingol National Park

Thailand
Lalu (ละลุ), rock formations caused by erosion at the eastern end of the Sankamphaeng Range in Sa Kaeo Province
Phae Mueang Phi ("Ghost Canyon") near Phrae in the Phi Pan Nam Range
Phu Phra Bat Buabok in Udon Thani Province

Turkey

Paşabağı, Cappadocia
Goreme National Park

Other countries

Gobustan National Park, Azerbaijan
Kyaiktiyo Pagoda, Mon State, Burma
Aphrodite's Rock, Paphos, Cyprus
Tanah Lot, Bali, Indonesia
Jeti-Ögüz, Jeti-Ögüz district, Kyrgyzstan
Tanjong Bunga, Penang, Malaysia
Al Naslaa rock formation, Saudi Arabia
Long Ya Men, Singapore
Seorak-san National Park, Sokcho, South Korea
Yehliu, Taiwan
Halong Bay, Vietnam

Africa

Kenya
Tsavo Rocks

Libya
Jebel Akhdar

Madagascar

Andringitra Massif
Tsingy d'Ankarana
Tsingy de Bemaraha
Tsingy de Namoroka
Tsingy Rouge

Mauritania
Ben Amera

Namibia
Bogenfels

Nigeria
Olumo Rock, Abeokuta
Riyom Rock, Jos
Zuma Rock, Abuja

South Africa
Cedarberg Wilderness Area, Western Cape
Kagga Kamma, Ceres, Western Cape
Three Sisters (Northern Cape)

North America

United States

Canada

Devil's Chair, Lake Superior Provincial Park, Ontario
Flowerpot Island, Georgian Bay, Ontario
Grand Manan Island, New Brunswick
Hopewell Rocks, New Brunswick
Gabriola Island, British Columbia
Brady's Beach, Bamfield, British Columbia
Chimney Rock, Marble Canyon, British Columbia
Heron Rocks, Hornby Island, British Columbia
Siwash Rock, Stanley Park, Vancouver, British Columbia
Percé Rock, Gaspé, Quebec
Tete d'Indien, Perce, Gaspé, Quebec
Balancing Rock, Long Island, Nova Scotia
Peggy's Cove, Nova Scotia
Banff National Park, Alberta
Big Rock, Okotoks, Alberta
Drumheller, Alberta
Walsh, Alberta, see Medicine Hat, Alberta
Main Topsail Hill, near Gaff Topsails, Newfoundland and Labrador
Arches, St. Anthony, Newfoundland and Labrador
Elephant Rock, Prince Edward Island
Giant's Chair, Howard's Cove, Prince Edward Island
Victoria Rock, Yukon
Sleeping Giant, Ontario

Caribbean

Ayo Rock Formations, Aruba
Devil's Trail, Virgin Gorda, British Virgin Islands
The Baths, Virgin Gorda, British Virgin Islands
Coki Beach, St. Thomas, United States Virgin Islands
Pointe des Châteaux, Grande Terre, Guadeloupe
Diamond Rock (Rocher du Diamant), Martinique

Mexico
Sierra de Organos National Park, Sombrerete, Zacatecas
Piedras Encimadas Valley, Zacatlán, Puebla
Peña de Bernal, Bernal, Querétaro
Copper Canyon, Chihuahua
Los Arcos Rocks, Cabo San Lucas, Baja California Sur
Hierve el Agua, San Lorenzo Albarradas

Central America
Bosque del Cabo, Osa Peninsula, Costa Rica
Los Ladrillos, Boquete, Panama

South America

Argentina
Quebrada de Humahuaca, Humahuaca
Ongamira Valley, Córdoba
Ischigualasto, San Juan Province
Monte Fitz Roy, El Chalten

Bolivia
Dali's Desert, Potosi
Valle de Las Rocas, Uyuni
Canon de Duene

Brazil
Pão de Açúcar (Sugarloaf Mountain), Rio de Janeiro
Ponta Grossa, Paraná
Pedro do Jacare, São Paulo
Dedo de Deus (God's Finger Rock), Serra dos Órgãos, Rio de Janeiro
Pedra do Cão Sentado, Nova Friburgo, Rio de Janeiro
Pedra da Galinha Choca, Quixadá, Ceará

Chile
Valle de la Luna, Antofagasta
Playa de la Calabocillos, Constitucion
Silla del Diablo

Colombia
El Peñón de Guatapé (La Piedra de Peñol), Antioquia
Laguna de La Plaza, Sierra Nevada del Cocuy

Ecuador
Cerro de Arcos, Loja
Pinnacle Rock, Bartolome Island, Galápagos Islands

Falkland Islands
 Princes Street Stone Run

Paraguay
Amambay

Peru
Colca Canyon, Arequipa

Uruguay
La Piedra Pintada, Parque Congreso de Abril

Venezuela
Tepui, Roraima, Canaima National Park
Piedras de San Martin, La Vela de Coro, Estado Falcón

Europe

Albania

Bosnia and Herzegovina
 Hajdučka vrata, Čvrsnica mountain

Bulgaria

 Basarbovo Monastery, Rousse
 Belogradchik Rocks
 Iskar Gorge, Sofia
 Melnik Earth Pyramids, Melnik
 Sozopol
 Wonderful Bridges
 Golden Bridges (‘Zlatnite Mostove’), Vitosha
 Golyamata Gramada (‘Big Pile’), Vitosha
 Pobiti Kamani

Croatia

 Paklenica
 Bijele stijene (White Rocks) and Samarske stijene (Samar Rocks), Velika Kapela mountain

Czech Republic

Teplice nad Metují
Medvědí Stezka (Bear's path), Šumava mountains, Klatovy
Vraní skála, Brdy
Suché skály, Turnov
Hruboskalsko

Denmark
Bornholm
Fur Formation
Møns Klint, Møn
Gedser Odde, Gedser
Stevns Klint, Eastern Zealand
Cliffs of Sangstrup, Djursland

Estonia

Vormsi island

Finland

Närpes
Naantali

France
 Roussillon, Vaucluse
 Lesconil, Brittany
 Les Calanche, Corsica
 Rocher des Doms, Avignon
 Étretat, Normandy
 Cassis, near Marseille, Provence

Georgia
Katskhi Pillar

Germany
List of rock formations in the Harz
Battert Rocks, Baden-Baden, Black Forest
Externsteine
Falkenfelsen
Lange Anna, Heligoland
Rotenfels, Nahe, Bad Münster am Stein-Ebernburg, Rhineland-Palatinate
Teufelsturm, Elbe Sandstone Mountains
Wasgau

Greece
Meteora
Monemvasia
Samaria Gorge, Crete
Sarti, Sithonia

Gibraltar

Rock of Gibraltar

Bailiwick of Guernsey
Les Autelets, Sark, Channel Islands
Telegraph Bay, Alderney, Channel Islands

Iceland
Vestmannaeyjar
Jokulsa Canyon National Park, Mývatn
Dimmuborgir, Mývatn
Dyrhólaey
Eystrahorn, Hvalnes

Ireland
Beara Peninsula, Bantry, County Cork
Skellig Rocks, Iveragh Peninsula, County Kerry
Gap of Dunloe, Killarney, County Kerry
Tory Island, County Donegal
Achill Island, County Mayo
Answering Stone, County Waterford

Italy

Il Gargano, Vieste, Apulia
Palmarola, Sicily
 Pietra di Bismantova, Reggiano Apennines
Valle Seriana, Bergamo, Lombardy
Golfo di Orosei, Cala Luna, Monte Tiscali, Sardinia
Tarpeian Rock

Latvia

Vidzeme
Pusena Kalns, Bartava

North Macedonia 
 Stone town of Kuklica
 Markovi Kuli

Malta

Dwerja, Gozo
Dingli Cliffs, Dingli

Isle of Man
Glen Maye, Isle of Man

Norway

 Skude, Beiningen, Haugaland
 Geirangerfjord
 Preikestolen
 Kjerag
 Troll Wall
 Nigardsbreen, part of the larger glacier Jostedalsbreen
 Sommarøy, Tromsø
 Jutulhogget (Rondane)
Trolltunga

Poland
Cudgel of Hercules – monadrock in Ojców National Park
Mnich 
Słoneczna
Dolina Koscieliska, Western Tatras
Dunajec Gorge, Zakopane

Portugal

Ponta da Piedade, Lagos, Algarve
Albufeira
Porto Moniz, Madeira
Ponta de Sao Lourenco, Madeira

Romania

Apuseni Mountains: Detunatele
Bucegi Mountains: Babele, The Sphinx
Ciucaș Mountains: Porumbelul Bratocei, Colții Bratocei, Turnul Goliat, Babele la sfat, etc.
Făgăraş Mountains: Fereastra zmeilor
Hășmaș Mountains: Piatra singuratică
Piatra Craiului Mountains: La zaplaz, Cerdacul Stanciului, Turnul/Degetul lui Anghelide
Gorges: Bicaz Gorge, Turda Gorge, Danube's Iron Gate (includes Babacai Rock), Cheile Dobrogei, Cheile Sohodolului, Cheile Doftanei (aka Brebului)
Piatra Secuiului in Alba County
Piatra Verde (or Muntele Verde) and the Salt Mountain in Slănic
Râpa Roșie

Russia

The Three Brothers, Busani, Buryatia
Kamen Shahtai, Lake Baikal
Kisilyakh Range, Yakutia, topped by kigilyakh formations
Kisilyakh-Tas, Yakutia, topped by kigilyakh formations
Kontalaksky Golets, Zabaykalsky Krai
Kyun-Tas, Yakutia, topped by kigilyakh formations
Lena Cheeks, Irkutsk Oblast
Lena Pillars, Yakutia
Monrepo Park, Vyborg, St. Petersburg
Stolby National Park, Krasnoyarsk Krai
Sail Rock, Krasnodar Krai
Taganay National Park, Chelyabinsk
Ulakhan-Sis, Yakutia, topped by kigilyakh formations

Serbia

 Đavolja Varoš (Devil's Town)
 Prskalo waterfall, Kučaj mountains
 Vratna Gates three natural stone bridges
 Đavoljev kamen near Trgovište

Spain

Los Roques de Garcia, Tenerife Island, Canary Islands
Las Canades, Tenerife Island, Canary Islands
Ciudad Encantada, Castilla–La Mancha
Picuezo and Picueza, Autol, La Rioja
Fuente de los Azulejos, Gran Canaria Island, Canary Islands
El Torcal de Antequera and Peña de los Enamorados, Antequera, Andalusia, a World Heritages Sites
Roque Nublo, Gran Canaria Island, Canary Islands
Montserrat, Catalonia
Roques de Benet, Ports de Beseit, Catalonia
Los Callejones de Las Majadas, Serranía de Cuenca, Castile-La Mancha
El Guerrero Romano, Sierra Carrascosa, Aragon
Mallos de Riglos, Las Peñas de Riglos, Aragon
Peña Bajenza in La Rioja
Las Médulas, Province of León, site of Roman gold mines
La Peña, Arcos de la Frontera, Andalusia
Peñón de Ifach, Calpe, Valencian Community

Sweden

The islands Gotland, Fårö and Öland have many coastal stretches with stack formations.
Busten, Glaskogens Nature Reserve, Kalleboda
Stegborgsgarden, Stegborg
Stenhamra, Uppland

Switzerland

Mount Pilatus
Val dal Botsch

Slovakia

Lehotské skaly, near Handlová
Haligovské skaly, near Stará Ľubovňa
Súľovské skaly (part of the Súľovské vrchy Mountains)
Zelené Pleso Valley (in the High Tatras)
Devin Castle, Devin

Ukraine
 Hoverla, Carpathian Mountains
 Nikita, Ukraine, Yalta
 Skaly Taraktasky, Crimea
 Karadag, Crimea
 Cape Fiolent, Sevastopol

United Kingdom

Oceania

Australia 

The Three Sisters, Katoomba – Blue Mountains, New South Wales
Devils Marbles, Northern Territory
Kata Tjuta, also known as The Olgas, Northern Territory
Rainbow Valley, Northern Territory
Uluru, also known as Ayers Rock, Northern Territory
Murphys Haystacks, Nullarbor Desert, South Australia
Remarkable Rocks, South Australia
Twelve Apostles, Great Ocean Road, Victoria
Mount Augustus, Western Australia
Pinnacles Desert, Nambung National Park, Western Australia
Wave Rock, Hyden, Western Australia

New Zealand 

Castle Hill Basin, Canterbury
Koutu Boulders, Hokianga
Māori Bay giant pillow lava, Muriwai
Lion Rock, Piha
Moeraki Boulders, Otago
The Nuggets, Catlins Coast, Otago
Pancake Rocks, Punakaiki
Putangirua Pinnacles, Wairarapa
Stony Batter, Waiheke Island
Truman Track Beach, Punakaiki
Horeke basalts, Hokianga
Gog and Magog, southern Stewart Island/Rakiura

Other countries 
Fatu Hiva, Marquesas Islands, French Polynesia
Moso's Footprint, Samoa
Talava Arches, Niue, South Pacific

See also

References

External links

Erosion landforms
Lists of landforms